This is a list of University of Zaragoza people, including notable alumni and staff.

Notable alumni

Science/Math/Academics
Santiago Ramón y Cajal, awarded the Nobel Prize in Physiology or Medicine in 1906 and is widely recognized as the father of modern neuroscience. A mention of his famous brain cell drawings was made in episode 16 of season 6, “The Tangible Affection Proof”, of The Big Bang Theory television show
María Yzuel, Spanish physicist and SPIE President in 2009
Gaspar Lax, Spanish philosopher and mathematician
Fidel Pagés, developer of the epidural anesthesia technique, he received his degree in Medicine and Surgery with honors in 1908
Jerónimo Blancas, historian and scholar, published the treatise Aragonensium rerum commentarii

Business
César Alierta, Chief Executive Officer and Chairman of Telefónica S.A.

Artists/Writers
Antonio Mingote, Spanish cartoonist and writer
Dino Valls, Spanish Painter
José Antonio Labordeta, singer/songwriter of “Aragón” and “Canto a la Libertad”, and the founder of the Andalán newspaper
José Martí, national Cuban hero, writer and recognized as one of the great Latin American intellects of the 1800s  
Juan Loreno Palmireno, Spanish poet, author and playwright
Lupercio and Bartolomé de Argensola, brothers and Spanish poets
Maria Moliner,  librarian and lexicographer, known for her Diccionario de uso del español (Dictionary of Spanish use)
Fernando Lázaro Carreter, President (1992–98) of the Royal Spanish Academy (Real Academia Española), the official royal institution responsible for overseeing the Spanish language.
Fernando Aramburu, poet, narrator and essayist, awarded Premio de la Crítica to the best narrative in Spanish in 2017.  He earned his degree in Hispanic Philology from the University of Zaragoza in 1982.

Politics/Law
Jordan de Asso, jurist, historian and naturalist
Manuel Azaña, 2nd President of the Second Spanish Republic, served as 55th and 63rd Prime Minister of Spain. He earned his degree in Law in 1897
Manuel de Roda, Ambassador in Rome under King Fernando VI and Ministry of "Grace and Justice" under King Carlos III of Spain
Xabier Arzalluz, Spanish Basque nationalist politician
María Elósegui, Spanish professor and judge

Religion
Pedro Apaolaza, archbishop of Zaragoza (1635–1643)

Celebrity
Adriana Abenia, model, actress and TV Personality

Notable emeritus faculty
Pedro Simón Abril, Known for his translations of work by famous philosophers such as Aristotle, Plato and others; also a primary figure in the Spanish humanism movement of the 16th century (1530–1595)
 Matías Barrio y Mier, historian of law, chair of Geografia Historica 1874, Carlist political leader (1844–1909)
 Salvador Minguijón Adrián, historian of law, chair of Historia General del Derecho Español 1911–1933, 1936–1938 (1874–1959)

References

University of Zaragoza alumni